In Norse mythology, Hœnir (also Hǿnir; modern Icelandic , modern Swedish ) is one of the Æsir. He is mentioned in Vǫluspá as one of the three gods (along with Odin and Lóðurr) that created the first humans.

Attestations 
In Völuspá, at the creation of the first human beings, Ask and Embla, Hœnir and Lóðurr help Odin. According to the Prose Edda, Hœnir is said to have given reason to man.

In Gylfaginning, Vili and Vé are mentioned instead. As Snorri Sturluson knew Völuspá, it is possible that Hœnir was another name for Vili. Also according to Völuspá, Hœnir was one of the few gods that would survive Ragnarök. In Ynglinga saga, along with Mímir, he went to the Vanir as a hostage to seal a truce after the Æsir-Vanir War. There, Hœnir was indecisive and relied on Mímir for all of his decisions, grunting noncommital answers when Mímir was absent.

Hœnir also has a minor role in Haustlöng and Reginsmál.

In the medieval Faroese ballad Lokka táttur, Hœnir protects a farmer's boy through summoning seven swans.

Theories
According to Viktor Rydberg and other scholars, such as Gudbrand Vigfusson, the epithets langifótr 'Long-legs' and aurkonungr 'mud-king', together with the Greek cognate κύκνος 'swan' and Sanskrit शकुन (śakuna) 'bird of omen', suggest that Hœnir was connected with the stork. This would also seem to be confirmed by the European children's story of the stork delivering babies to their parents, and Hœnir's role in Lokka táttur, which further confirms his associations with birds.

Notes

Sources
 Viktor Rydberg 1886, Undersökningar i germanisk mythologi, first part.

External links
MyNDIR (My Norse Digital Image Repository) Illustrations of Hœnir from manuscripts and early print books. Clicking on the thumbnail will give you the full image and information concerning it.

Creator gods
Æsir
Norse gods
Animal gods
Storks